Alexis Peak, is a  mountain in the Misinchinka Ranges of the Hart Ranges in Northern British Columbia.

Named after Canadian Army Lance Corporal Alexander Alexis, from Prince George, BC.  Lance Corporal Alexis was killed in action 18 August 1944, during Operation Tractable, that took place in the final days of the Battle of Falaise Pocket.  He was a member of the 3rd Canadian Division, Royal Winnipeg Rifles and is buried in the Beny-Sur-Mer Canadian War Cemetery.

References 

World War II memorials in Canada
Northern Interior of British Columbia
Two-thousanders of British Columbia
Canadian Rockies
Cariboo Land District